Smugglers' Ridge or Ma Tsz Keng is a hill with a height of  in New Territories, Hong Kong. It is inside Kam Shan Country Park. A part of Shing Mun Tunnels is built underneath this hill.

Name
The name Smugglers' Ridge originally referred to a ridge trail on this mountain. Later, this mountain was named after this ridge trail.

Access
Stage 6 of the MacLehose Trail goes through this peak.

See also
 Golden Hill

References